The Finn was a sailing event on the Sailing at the 1976 Summer Olympics program in Kingston, Ontario. Seven races were scheduled. 28 sailors, on 28 boats, from 28 nations competed.

Results 

DNF = Did Not Finish, DNS= Did Not Start, DSQ = Disqualified, PMS = Premature Start, YMP = Yacht Materially Prejudiced 
 = Male,  = Female

Daily standings

Notes

References 
 
 
 
 

Finn
Finn competitions